Edmund DelGuercio (born March 9, 1983) is an American coxswain. He won a gold medal at the 2008 World Rowing Championships in Ottensheim with the lightweight men's eight.

References

1983 births
Living people
American male rowers
World Rowing Championships medalists for the United States
Coxswains (rowing)
Rowers at the 2007 Pan American Games
Pan American Games medalists in rowing
Pan American Games gold medalists for the United States
Medalists at the 2007 Pan American Games